Wizzard Brew is the debut album by rock group Wizzard, released in 1973 on EMI's Harvest label. It reached a peak of No. 29 in the UK Albums Chart. In the United States, it was released by United Artists Records as Wizzard's Brew (with a different cover photo) but failed to chart there.

In 2003, Mojo magazine ranked it number 18 on its list of the "Top 50 Eccentric Albums".

Release

The original release included an insert with song lyrics on one side and photos of the band members on the other. It was reissued on CD in 1999 but soon deleted.  An expanded remastered edition, including the four A-side and B-sides of the group's singles tracks, was released on CD in November 2006.

Reception

Stephen Thomas Erlewine, in a retrospective review for AllMusic, felt that Roy Wood differentiated between the accessibility of Wizzard's singles and the "real art" of Wizzard Brew.

Wood frequently used ring modulation to give the instruments a harsh, distorted sound.  Critical and popular reaction was mixed.

Track listing
All songs written by Roy Wood, except where noted

"You Can Dance the Rock 'n' Roll"  – 4:36
"Meet Me at the Jailhouse"  – 13:30
"Jolly Cup of Tea"  – 2:08
"Buffalo Station - Get On Down to Memphis"  – 7:30
"Gotta Crush (About You)"  – 3:37
"Wear a Fast Gun"  – 9:10

2006 bonus tracks
"Ball Park Incident" ('A') - 3:42
"The Carlsberg Special (Pianos Demolished Phone 021 373 4472)" (Bill Hunt) ('B') - 4:16
"See My Baby Jive" ('A') - 5:01
"Bend Over Beethoven" - (Hugh McDowell) ('B') - 4:42
"Angel Fingers" ('A') - 4:39
"You Got the Jump on Me" - (Rick Price) ('B') - 6:28
"Rob Roy's Nightmare (A Bit More H.A.)" - (Mike Burney) ('B') - 3:47
"I Wish It Could Be Christmas Everyday" ('A') - 4:48

iTunes bonus track
"Meet Me at the Jailhouse" (US Insert) - 0:47
 Included as a hidden track on the CD reissues

Personnel
 Roy Wood – vocal, electric and acoustic guitars, sitar, cello, bassoon, baritone saxophone, string bass, B-flat bass tuba, trombone, recorder, percussion
 Rick Price – bass guitar, vocals, percussion
 Bill Hunt – piano, harpsichord, French horn, trumpet, flugelhorn, tenor horn, bugle, euphonium, E flat tuba, little glass, backing vocals
 Hugh 'H' McDowell – cello and ARP synthesizer
 Nick Pentelow – tenor saxophone, clarinet, flute, bass backing vocals
 Mike Burney – alto, tenor, baritone and synthesized saxes, clarinet, flute
 Keith Smart – drums
 Charlie Grima – drums, congas, percussion
 The Cowbag Choir

Charts

References

External links 
 

1973 debut albums
Wizzard albums
Albums produced by Roy Wood
EMI Records albums
Harvest Records albums